Elisabetta Introini (born 30 November 1961) is an Italian former canoer, that won three international medals in Canoe maraton world championships.

Biography
She competed in the early 1980s. At the 1980 Summer Olympics in Moscow, she was eliminated in the semifinals of the K-2 500 m event while withdrawing from the heats of the K-1 500 m event.

References

External links
 
 

1961 births
Canoeists at the 1980 Summer Olympics
Italian female canoeists
Living people
Olympic canoeists of Italy